Thomas K. (Tom) Ascol is an evangelical Christian pastor, author, and president of Founders Ministries. He is currently the senior pastor of Grace Baptist Church in Cape Coral, Florida, where he has served for 36 years as of June 2022.

Biography
Tom Ascol has served as a pastor of Grace Baptist Church in Cape Coral, Florida since 1986. Prior to moving to Florida he served as a pastor and associate pastor of churches in Texas. He has a B.S. from Texas A&M University (1979) and has also earned the M.Div and Ph.D degrees from Southwestern Baptist Theological Seminary in Ft. Worth, Texas. He has served as an adjunct professor of theology for various colleges and seminaries, including Reformed Theological Seminary, the Covenant Baptist Theological Seminary, African Christian University, Copperbelt Ministerial College, and Reformed Baptist Seminary. He has also served as Visiting Professor at the Nicole Institute for Baptist Studies at Reformed Theological Seminary  in Orlando, Florida.

Ascol serves as the president of Founders Ministries and the Institute of Public Theology. He has edited the Founders Journal, and has been a regular contributor to TableTalk, the monthly magazine of Ligonier Ministries. Ascol regularly preaches and lectures at various conferences throughout the United States and other countries. He also hosts a weekly podcast called The Sword & The Trowel.

Involvement in public theology

Proposal to prosecute women who get abortions for murder 
Ascol believes that any woman who gets an abortion should be prosecuted for murder and face jail time, regardless of circumstances.

Resolutions at the Southern Baptist Convention
In June 2008, Ascol was successful in spearheading Resolution (No. 6) "On Regenerate Church Membership and Church Member Restoration" and an accompanying amendment that encouraged Southern Baptist Convention churches to repent for failing to maintain biblical standards in the membership of their churches and obey Jesus Christ in the practice of lovingly correcting wayward church members.
In 2019, Ascol offered an amendment to Resolution (No. 9) “On Critical Race Theory and Intersectionality” arguing that the amendment would strengthen the resolution by acknowledging the roots of these ideologies and making it more explicitly theological. The amendment failed in a split vote and the controversial resolution was adopted. In 2021, Ascol joined with others in submitting a new resolution, “On CRT/I Being Incompatible with the Baptist Faith and Message;” however, the committee on resolutions declined to bring the new resolution to the convention floor despite its being signed and submitted by more than 1300 Southern Baptists. After the resolutions committee declined to bring the new resolution, Ascol led an attempt to rescind Resolution 9, adopted in the 2019 convention. That motion was ruled out of order by President J. D. Greear and the convention did not get to vote on it.

National involvement
Ascol was a primary drafter of the 2018 Dallas Statement on Social Justice and the Gospel, a statement of 14 resolutions and denials on topics like the church, sexuality and marriage, and racism. The statement was publicly released on September 4, 2018 and has garnered more than 17,000 signers worldwide.
In 2019, Ascol was asked to speak at the annual Conservative Political Action Conference (CPAC) held in Oxon Hill, Maryland where he spoke on the progressive ideological challenges to Biblical Christianity.

Founders Ministries
Begun in 1982, Founders Ministries exists for the recovery of the Gospel and the reformation of local churches. Ascol serves as president of the organization and is a regular contributor both in the quarterly academic publication, The Founders Journal and the Founders Ministry Blog. Ascol also co-hosts a weekly podcast, The Sword & The Trowel, which currently has over 200 episodes and 4.8 stars out of over 600 ratings. The podcast regularly engages with issues at the intersection of culture, politics, and theology.

In 2021, Founders Ministry opened the Institute of Public Theology, with Ascol as a member of the founding faculty. Ascol taught the inaugural course, “The Pastor in the Public Square,” in the Fall 2021 semester.

Personal life 
He and his wife Donna have six children along with four sons-in-law and a daughter-in-law; they have fifteen grandchildren.

Publications
Founders Journal (Editor)
Amazing Grace: The History and Theology of Calvinism (Documentary | Contributor)
Sword and Trowel (Podcast)
By What Standard? God’s World… God’s Rules (Cinedoc | Producer)
Wield the Sword (Docuseries | Producer)
Ministry By His Grace and For His Glory (Editor)
Reclaiming the Gospel and Reforming Churches (Editor)
Truth and Grace Memory Book 1 (Author)
Truth and Grace Memory Book 2 (Author)
Truth and Grace Memory Book 3 (Author)
From the Protestant Reformation to the SBC (Author)
Dear Timothy: Letters on Pastoral Ministry (Editor)
Traditional Theology and the SBC (Author)
Strong and Courageous: Following Jesus Amid the Rise of America's New Religion (Author)

References

External links
Founders Ministries
Grace Baptist Church Official Website
Founders Blog
Institute of Public Theology
List of books by Tom Ascol
The Sword and The Trowel Podcast
By What Standard Cinedoc

Baptist writers
Baptist ministers from the United States
Living people
American evangelicals
American sermon writers
American Calvinist and Reformed theologians
Year of birth missing (living people)
20th-century Calvinist and Reformed theologians
21st-century Calvinist and Reformed theologians